Scirus was a comprehensive science-specific search engine, first launched in 2001. Like CiteSeerX and Google Scholar, it was focused on scientific information. Unlike CiteSeerX, Scirus was not only for computer sciences and IT and not all of the results included full text. It also sent its scientific search results to Scopus, an abstract and citation database covering scientific research output globally. Scirus was owned and operated by Elsevier.
In 2013 an announcement appeared, on the Scirus homepage, announcing the site's retirement in 2014:

"We are sad to say goodbye. Scirus is set to retire in early 2014. An official retirement date will be posted here as soon as it is determined. To ensure a smooth transition, we are informing you now so that you have sufficient time to find an alternative search solution for science-specific content. Thank you for being a devoted user of Scirus. We have enjoyed serving you."

By February 2014, the Scirus homepage indicated that the service was no longer running.

See also 
 Academic databases and search engines
 Author-level metrics
 CiteSeerX
 Impact factor

References

External links 
 Scirus homepage
 Scirus, Péter's Digital Reference Shelf, Gale Reference Reviews

Bibliographic databases and indexes
Elsevier
Scholarly search services